Zion-Benton Township High School, or ZBTHS, is a public high school located at the corner of Kenosha Road and 21st Street in Zion, Illinois, a northern suburb of  Chicago, Illinois, in the United States. It is part of Zion-Benton Township High School District 126. The school mascot/symbol is the Fighting Zee-Bee which was adapted from the Navy Seabees of World War II. In 2008 the district opened a partner school near the former ZBTHS Pearce Campus called New Tech High at Zion-Benton East, a 4-year high school associated with the New Tech Network of Napa, California. New Tech High at Zion-Benton East is located at the division of Bethesda Avenue and 23rd Street in Zion.

ZBTHS is fed by three major middle schools, including North Prairie Junior High of Winthrop Harbor, IL, Beach Park Middle School of Beach Park, IL and Zion Central Middle School of Zion, IL. ZBTHS is one of the most diverse high schools in the state of Illinois. The district is 17.99% Caucasian, 26.3% African American, 47.3% Hispanic, 2.3% Asian and Pacific Islander, .3% Native American, and 5.6% identifying as two or more races (2018–19).

Athletics
Zion-Benton, along with New Tech in a combined athletic program, competes in the North Suburban Conference and Illinois High School Association. The ZB Majorettes have won 18 straight Illinois State championships, and have placed nationally several times.

Notable alumni

 Joe Daniels - musician
 Scot Lucas - musician
 Billy McKinney - NBA basketball player
Admiral Schofield - 2nd round NBA Draft Pick
Lenzelle Smith Jr. (born 1991) - basketball player in the Israel Basketball Premier League

References

External links
 

Public high schools in Illinois
Educational institutions established in 1939
Zion, Illinois
Schools in Lake County, Illinois
1939 establishments in Illinois